Laurence Oliphant is the name of:

Laurence Oliphant, 1st Lord Oliphant (1434–1498), Scottish nobleman
Laurence Oliphant, 3rd Lord Oliphant (died 1566), Scottish nobleman
Laurence Oliphant, 4th Lord Oliphant (1529–1593), Scottish nobleman
Laurence Oliphant, 5th Lord Oliphant
Laurence Oliphant (author) (1829–1888), British MP for Stirling Burghs, international traveller, diplomat and mystic
Laurence Oliphant (Jacobite) (1691–1767), army officer
Laurence Oliphant (Scottish politician) (1791–1862), MP for Perth, 1832
Laurence Oliphant (British Army officer) (1846–1914), British Army General